The 1949–50 NCAA men's basketball season began in December 1949, progressed through the regular season and conference tournaments, and concluded with the 1950 NCAA basketball tournament championship game on March 28, 1950, at Madison Square Garden in New York, New York. The City College of New York Beavers won their first NCAA national championship with a 71–68 victory over the Bradley Braves.

Season headlines 

 CCNY became the only team ever to win both the NCAA tournament and the National Invitation Tournament in the same season. CCNY defeated Bradley in the championship game of both tournaments.

Conference membership changes

Regular season

Conference winners and tournaments

Informal championships

Statistical leaders

Post-season tournaments

NCAA tournament

Semifinals & finals 

 Third Place – NC State 53, Baylor 41

National Invitation tournament

Semifinals & finals 

 Third Place – St. John's 69, Duquesne 67

Awards

Consensus All-American teams

Major player of the year awards 

 Helms Player of the Year: Paul Arizin, Villanova
 Sporting News Player of the Year: Paul Arizin, Villanova

Other major awards 

 NIT/Haggerty Award (Top player in New York City metro area): Sherman White, Long Island

Coaching changes 

A number of teams changed coaches during the season and after it ended.

References